Lee Ho-Seung (born December 21, 1989) is a South Korean football player who plays for Jeonnam Dragons.

Club statistics

References

External links
 
 

1989 births
Living people
Association football goalkeepers
South Korean footballers
South Korean expatriate footballers
J1 League players
J2 League players
K League 1 players
K League 2 players
Hokkaido Consadole Sapporo players
Shonan Bellmare players
Jeonnam Dragons players
Expatriate footballers in Japan
South Korean expatriate sportspeople in Japan